Marc Fornell Mestres (born 26 January 1982) is a professional tennis player from Spain. He has captured two ATP Challenger Series/Tour titles. Fornell Mestres's career-high ATP singles entry ranking is World No. 236, achieved on 19 November 2007.

On 31 December 2018, he was provisionally suspended from tennis for leading a match-fixing group. In 2022, Fornell Mestres was convicted of match fixing and received a 2-year suspended prison sentence and a 450€ fine. He was also fined $250,000 and banned from professional tennis for 22 years and 6 months by the International Tennis Integrity Agency.

Career titles

Singles (15)

Doubles (42)

References

External links
 
 

1982 births
Living people
Tennis players from Catalonia
Spanish male tennis players
Tennis players from Barcelona
Match fixers
21st-century Spanish people